Sky Broadband is a broadband service offered by Sky UK in the United Kingdom. With the introduction of Sky Fibre, Sky Broadband now refers to ADSL broadband products.

History
In October 2005, Sky UK agreed to purchase the ISP EasyNet for £211 million. At the time, EasyNet were one of two companies in the UK that had made major investments in local-loop unbundling (LLU), providing Sky with access to 232 unbundled telephone exchanges. The purchased company was placed under a new Sky division, Sky Broadband. In October 2007, Sky reached the 1 million mark in terms of customer numbers, and claim to be adding one new customer every 40 seconds.  By September 2009, it had 2.3 million customers. By July 2012 Sky had reached 4 million customers, and unbundled exchanges covering over 70% of the United Kingdom. By January 2017, Sky said it had 6.1 million customers.

Sky agreed on 1 March 2013 to buy the fixed telephone line and broadband business of Telefónica UK, trading under the O2 and BE brands. The company agreed to pay £180 million initially, followed by a further £20 million after all customers have been transferred to Sky's existing Broadband and telephone business. and customers were transferred during 2014.

Networking
Sky Broadband provides Sky customers with download speeds of up to 20Mbit/s (ADSL2+ from Sky enabled exchanges,  by means of LLU) and up to 76Mbit/s from exchanges enabled for FTTC via an Openreach landline.

In July 2006, Sky also introduced a free broadband and calls package for its digital TV subscribers within the Sky Broadband network area. This means anyone on Sky can get free broadband (subject to a 2GB/month usage limit) and free evening & weekend telephone calls, as long as the line is in a Sky Broadband network area.

For customers whose exchange has not been enabled for the above services, the Connect service is available using the BT Wholesale ADSL Max network.

Sky launched Sky Broadband in the Republic of Ireland in February 2013.

Speeds
As with all DSL connections, the further the distance from the DSLAM (usually located at the telephone exchange) the customer site is, the slower the line speed will be. Sky uses DLM (dynamic line management) over the first ten days of a new connection to set the line at an acceptable downstream and upstream speed in order for the connection to remain stable. Lines are initially connected at 4Mbit/s and gradually increased over the ten-day "training period" until the line shows signs of instability, this allows Sky to know what speeds the line can handle whilst remaining stable.

In April 2012, Sky Fibre was launched almost two and a half years after British Telecom launched BT Infinity in January 2010.

In April 2014 it was announced they are to roll out 1 gigabit fibre-to-the-premises connections in the city of York in partnership with rival TalkTalk.

Sky Wireless Hub
The Sky Wireless Hub is a wireless router distributed to all Sky Broadband customers when they order their Sky Broadband packages.

During 2006, Netgear were the only manufacturer of Sky Broadband routers, which were made in white. From 2008, Netgear and Sagem were the manufacturers of the Sky Broadband routers, made in black and shaped to match the Sky+ HD box. Both routers are also distributed in smaller boxes (The boxes are now the size of the routers) as part of Sky UK’s low carbon scheme in turn reducing postage costs. The Sagem router unlike the Netgear router has added restrictions to features such as the built in inbound firewall settings and outbound/inbound VPN connections. However a firmware upgrade is available upon request, for users wishing to connect to an outbound VPN connection using Sky Broadband, while maintaining restrictions on the inbound firewall and inbound VPN connection.

Towards the end of 2010, D-Link started producing routers for Sky. The D-Link router is the DSL-2640S.

On Demand
Sky have created On Demand, which will combine Sky Broadband and Sky+ HD to offer a true on-demand service using the Ethernet socket of the Sky+ HD box and the Sky Broadband router. Sky Customers will be able to connect their Sky router to their Sky+ HD box via an Ethernet cable or Wi-Fi adapter, and stream content directly to their television. Unlike other VOD services, On Demand video will count towards a users data usage.

Now Broadband

Now Broadband (stylised as NOW Broadband) is a brand name of contract-free pricing plans that offer broadband internet and telephone service on a budget. It was launched in Summer 2016 as Now TV Combo, and was rebranded in early 2018 as Now Broadband. It is a brand extension of Sky's Now TV, an over-the-top internet television service which offers multichannel television and video-on-demand content on a budget.

Controversy
On 21 September 2010, the website of ACS:Law was subjected to a DDoS attack as part of Operation Payback. After the site came back online a 350MB file was uploaded containing spreadsheets listing more than 8,000 Sky broadband customers accused of making unauthorized downloads of adult films. This raised issues concerning Sky not following Data Protection Act guidelines.

Broadband Shield
In March 2014 Samuel L. Jackson and the other stars of Captain America: The Winter Soldier appeared in advertisements for the 'Sky Broadband Shield' web blocking product.

Sky Talk Shield
In June 2017 Sky launched a free nuisance call blocking service as an optional extra for their landline customers. The service screens calls automatically before the phone rings, preventing robot callers. Customers are played a recording of the caller's name and given the option to either accept the call, reject it or send to voicemail.

As was common for Sky Broadband marketing campaigns during the 2010s, the launch was promoted with an advert featuring a tie in with a film franchise, in this case, Despicable Me 3.

References

External links
 
 NOW Broadband

Sky Group
Telecommunications companies established in 2006
Internet service providers of the United Kingdom
2006 establishments in the United Kingdom